Richard Eyimofe Evans Mofe-Damijo (born 6 July 1961), popularly known as RMD, is a Nigerian actor, writer, producer, lawyer, and former journalist. He was also a former Commissioner for Culture and Tourism in Delta State in 2009. In 2005, he won the Africa Movie Academy Award for Best Actor in a Leading Role. He received a Lifetime Achievement Award at the 12th Africa Movie Academy Awards in 2016.

Early life 
Mofe-Damijo was born in Aladja community of Udu Kingdom, Delta State. He attended Midwest College, Warri and Anglican Grammar School and was a member of the Drama Club. He enrolled into the University of Benin to continue his education and studied Theatre Arts. In 1997, Mofe-Damijo returned to the university to study law at the University of Lagos and graduated in 2004.

Career 
After graduating from the university, Mofe-Damijo took part in the soap opera Ripples, but gained more popularity as villain Segun Kadiri in rival soap Checkmate. Before then, he had a stint as a writer with Concord Newspapers Metro Magazine, and Quality. Out of Bounds was the first film for which he received a writer/producer credit. In 2005, at the maiden edition of the African Movie Academy Awards, Mofe-Damijo won the award for Best Actor in a Leading Role. On 5 January 2017, he hosted the 2016 GLO-CAF Awards alongside Nigerian journalist Mimi Fawaz. On 8 December 2021, he won an award at Ghana, a Black Star Honor at the Rhymes on Da Runway in Gold coast, Ghana.

Political career 
Mofe-Damijo was appointed as the Special Adviser of Culture and Tourism to the then Governor Emmanuel Uduaghan in 2008, and later became the commissioner for Culture and Tourism of Delta State, Nigeria in 2009. His tenure ended in 2015.

Personal life 
Mofe-Damijo was married to a journalist/publisher and talk show host May Ellen 'MEE' Ezekiel. After her death in 1996, Mofe-Damijo married TV personality Jumobi Adegbesan, who later left TV presenting for the corporate world. Mofe-Damijo has five children: two with his current wife and three from his previous marriage.

Selected filmography

TV Shows

Awards and nominations

References

External links
 

1967 births
Best Actor Africa Movie Academy Award winners
Living people
Delta State politicians
University of Lagos alumni
Male actors from Warri
Political office-holders in Nigeria
20th-century Nigerian male actors
21st-century Nigerian male actors
Nigerian actor-politicians
University of Benin (Nigeria) alumni
Male actors in Yoruba cinema
Actors from Delta State
Nigerian male television actors
Nigerian film award winners
Nigerian lawyers
Nigerian film producers
Nigerian film directors
Nigerian writers
Nigerian male film actors
Lifetime Achievement Award Africa Movie Academy Award winners